St. Leo's College may refer to:

St Leo's College, University of Queensland, Australia
St. Leo's College, Carlow, Ireland
St. Leo's Catholic College, Wahroonga, Australia

See also
Saint Leo University, Florida, USA, previously known as Saint Leo College